Statistics of Empress's Cup in the 1990 season.

Overview
It was contested by 16 teams, and Nikko Securities Dream Ladies won the championship.

Results

1st Round
Yomiuri SC Beleza 5-0 Seiwa Gakuen SC
Ota Gal 1-1 (pen 3-4) Asahi Kokusai Bunnys
Shinko Seiko FC Clair 4-0 Shibecha Ladies
Nikko Securities Dream Ladies 0-0 (pen 4-1) Nissan FC
Prima Ham FC Kunoichi 2-1 Hiroshima Minami FC
Nawashiro Ladies 0-5 Takatsuki FC
Tasaki-Shinju Kobe 5-0 Shimizudaihachi SC
Akita FC 0-9 Suzuyo Shimizu FC Lovely Ladies

Quarterfinals
Yomiuri SC Beleza 6-3 Asahi Kokusai Bunnys
Shinko Seiko FC Clair 0-1 Nikko Securities Dream Ladies
Prima Ham FC Kunoichi 2-1 Takatsuki FC
Tasaki-Shinju Kobe 0-2 Suzuyo Shimizu FC Lovely Ladies

Semifinals
Yomiuri SC Beleza 0-0 (pen 2-4) Nikko Securities Dream Ladies
Prima Ham FC Kunoichi 0-1 Suzuyo Shimizu FC Lovely Ladies

Final
Nikko Securities Dream Ladies 3-3 (pen 4-1) Suzuyo Shimizu FC Lovely Ladies
Nikko Securities Dream Ladies won the championship.

References

Empress's Cup
1990 in Japanese women's football